Hamish Donald Blake (born 11 December 1981) is an Australian comedian, television and radio presenter, actor and author. Since 2003, he has worked with Andy Lee as part of the comedy duo Hamish and Andy. The pair have performed live and on television and radio, most notably with their drive-time radio program Hamish & Andy. As a solo performer, Blake has appeared on various Australian television programs, including the Melbourne International Comedy Festival's televised 2008 Great Debate, and has been a regular guest on Spicks and Specks, Rove and Thank God You're Here.

In April 2012, Blake and Lee won a Logie Award for their television program Hamish and Andy's Gap Year. Individually, Blake also won the Gold Logie Award for Most Popular Personality on Australian Television. In 2022, Blake was the recipient of the TV Week Bert Newton Award for most outstanding presenter.

Early life
Blake grew up in the Melbourne suburb of Glen Waverley. He is a middle child; his older brother, Lachlan, is a solicitor, and his sister, Sophie, has completed an arts degree. His parents, Noel and Kerry, separated when Blake was 17, with his father eventually remarrying. As a child, Blake says he was a fan of British comedy such as Monty Python, Fawlty Towers and Blackadder; as a teenager he "worshipped" comedians Tony Martin and Mick Molloy. Blake was a member of the National Boys Choir of Australia during the late 1980s. He attended primary school at Glen Waverley South Primary, high school at Caulfield Grammar School and later at St Leonard's College, graduating in 1999.

After a gap year, Blake enrolled at the University of Melbourne in a Science/Commerce double degree.  "I'm interested in artificial intelligence and computer science. That stuff still fascinates me," he says. However, a few weeks into the semester, he met Andy Lee: "That was the turning point. The wheels quickly fell off my academic career."  Blake eventually dropped out of university to pursue a career in comedy alongside Lee. Blake's first experience with comedy was when he entered a competition at university. He was broke at the time, and hoped to win the $500 first prize. His stand-up performance earned him third place and qualified him for a statewide universities' final, which he did win.

Career

Hamish and Andy

Hamish Blake has collaborated with fellow comedian Andy Lee as the duo Hamish and Andy since 2003, when they performed their breakout show at the Melbourne International Comedy Festival, a stage production about a trip they had taken to North Queensland in Blake's old car. Soon after, they trained with SYN Radio, gaining a drive-time shift, and created a show called Radio Karate for RMITV on community-access television station Channel 31, which they created in collaboration with Ryan Shelton and several other school friends. Radio Karate won an Antenna Award for best comedy program at the inaugural National Community Television Awards in February 2004, and one month later were offered a national comedy program on Australia's Seven Network.

The Hamish and Andy Show premiered on the Seven Network in March 2005, but failed to achieve ratings success and was cancelled after two weeks. Reviewers acknowledged the duo's talent, but criticised the show as "poorly executed". Blake says that while working on the show was a fun experience, they had little control over what happened and the way it went forward. Following the cancellation of The Hamish and Andy Show, they created a short mockumentary titled The Greystone 2800 about a couple who accidentally bought an open display home after failing to read the fine print on a housing purchase. The film won the Melbourne Comedy Festival Short Film competition and attracted the attention of comedian Rove McManus. This led to some small spots on McManus' Network Ten show Rove Live.

McManus's company, Roving Enterprises, also helped the duo develop Real Stories, a mock current affairs show that aired on Network Ten in 2006. Blake says that the experience of creating Real Stories was much more enjoyable than The Hamish and Andy Show because they had greater control over the series. Blake and Lee wrote, acted, directed, filmed, and produced the show with input from Ryan Shelton and Tim Bartley.

In 2006, Blake and Lee debuted a national drive-time radio show titled Hamish & Andy on the Today Network. The show quickly gained popularity, finishing 2006 with almost one million Melbourne listeners, ahead of 3AW's popular radio host Derryn Hinch. As of August 2008, Blake and Lee's show was rating number one in four out of Australia's five major capital cities. As of the beginning of 2009, the show is broadcast in all capital cities as well as many regional centres across the country.

In September 2008, it was announced that they would make a guest appearance on Ten's Are You Smarter Than A Fifth Grader?, which is hosted by Rove McManus. In the same year they also made a guest appearance on the Australian soap opera Neighbours.

On Wednesday 19 November 2008, at 7.30 pm, Hamish and Andy aired their own one-time episode, brought to you by Rove: Hamish & Andy Re-Gifted: A Very Early Christmas Special. This was to re-present everything they had accomplished in 2008 on Rove.

Hamish and Andy have also appeared on Channel Ten's Good News Week and The 7PM Project several times.

He is a founding member of a "rock-insult" band, Coolboys and the Frontman, along with Andy Lee and Jack Post.

Solo work
Blake has appeared on various Australian television series, including Spicks and Specks, Thank God You're Here, Twentysomething, Australia's Brainiest Comedian, The Librarians, The Panel, Rove, Talkin' 'bout your Generation and The Footy Show. He has also featured in the British version of Thank God You're Here. In 2008 he was a speaker for the negative team in the Melbourne International Comedy Festival's annual televised Great Debate.

He has a monthly column in the Australian women's magazine Cosmopolitan. He was also the winner of the TV Fugly Award for Spunkiest Male TV Personality in 2008. 
Hamish Blake was voted the comedian of the year in 2007 by the Eather corporation. His compatriot Andy Lee was placed 14th for 2007.
Blake also came first in 'Television's most powerful celebrity' for 2009, Lee came 19th.

On 20 January 2010, it was announced Hamish would be writing a column for the Herald Sun.

Hamish, along with his wife Zoë Foster Blake, has written a book on dating called Textbook Romance.

After scaling back his daily radio show to a weekly radio show and podcast, Hamish took on several new side projects. In 2011, Blake made an appearance in the ABC comedy Twentysomething, starring real-life best friends Jess Harris and Josh Schmidt. He also co-starred in his first feature film with Bret McKenzie of Flight of the Conchords, Two Little Boys, shot in New Zealand
Hamish joked: "I don't feel comfortable about cheating on Andy but now it's all out there. We've always had an open comedic relationship, but it was for one-night stands only, with no exchange of phone numbers. I've heard them [Andy and Jemaine Clement, Bret's comedic partner] whispering on the phone, plotting to do their own movie to release on the same day to sink ours."

In October 2022, Blake launched a podcast called How Other Dads Dad with Hamish Blake. The first season saw guests such as fellow fathers Rob Sitch, Adam Hills, Stan Grant, Max Gawn, Dave Hughes, and Ben Lee.

Personal life

Hamish is married to Zoë Foster Blake in 2012. They have two children: Sonny and Rudy.

Filmography

Actor

As himself

Writer

E. J. Whitten Legends Game 
In 2008 and 2009, Blake and working partner Lee played in the E. J. Whitten Legends Game. Lee played for Victoria, while Blake played for the All-Stars. Blake scored the winning goal for the All-Stars in 2008, and kicked an additional two goals in 2009.

Mr. New York State 2011
As part of a stunt for the TV series Hamish and Andy's Gap Year, Andy entered Hamish into the Mr. New York State bodybuilding competition in the Heavyweight division. Due to a technicality in which Blake was the only contestant over 200 pounds (the minimum requirement for a Heavyweight contender), he was awarded the title of Mr. New York State 2011 in the Heavyweight division.

Awards and nominations

See also
 List of Caulfield Grammar School people

References

External links

 

1981 births
Living people
Hamish & Andy
Australian radio personalities
Australian podcasters
Australian male comedians
People educated at Caulfield Grammar School
Comedians from Melbourne
Gold Logie winners
Australian game show hosts
RMITV alumni
People from Glen Waverley, Victoria